Jacqueline Lewis is an American Republican politician from Bridgewater, Massachusetts. She represented the 8th Plymouth district in the Massachusetts House of Representatives from 1985 to 1999.

See also
 1985-1986 Massachusetts legislature
 1987-1988 Massachusetts legislature
 1989-1990 Massachusetts legislature
 1991-1992 Massachusetts legislature
 1993-1994 Massachusetts legislature
 1995-1996 Massachusetts legislature
 1997-1998 Massachusetts legislature

References

Year of birth missing
Year of death missing
Republican Party members of the Massachusetts House of Representatives
Women state legislators in Massachusetts
20th-century American women politicians
People from Bridgewater, Massachusetts
20th-century American politicians